Kilve is a village in the Somerset West and Taunton district of Somerset, England, within the Quantock Hills Area of Outstanding Natural Beauty, the first AONB to be established, in 1957.

It lies on the A39 almost exactly equidistant from Bridgwater to the east and Minehead to the west. The village includes a 17th-century coaching inn, and a post office and stores. This part of the village, formerly known as Putsham, also contains the village hall, which was extended to celebrate the coronation of Queen Elizabeth II.

History

The village was listed in the Domesday Book of 1086 as  Clive, probably meaning cliff.

The parish of Kilve was part of the Williton and Freemanners Hundred.

Oil extraction

At the far end of the car park are the remains of a red brick retort, built in 1924, when it was discovered that the shale found in the cliffs was rich in oil. The beach is part of the Blue Anchor to Lilstock Coast SSSI (Site of Special Scientific Interest). Along this coast the cliffs are layered with compressed strata of oil-bearing shale and blue, yellow and brown lias embedded with fossils. In 1924 Dr Forbes-Leslie founded the Shaline Company to exploit them. This retort house is thought to be the first structure erected here for the conversion of shale to oil but the company was unable to raise sufficient capital and this is now all that remains of the anticipated Somerset oil boom.

Governance

The parish council has responsibility for local issues, including setting an annual precept (local rate) to cover the council’s operating costs and producing annual accounts for public scrutiny. The parish council evaluates local planning applications and works with the local police, district council officers, and neighbourhood watch groups on matters of crime, security, and traffic. The parish council's role also includes initiating projects for the maintenance and repair of parish facilities, as well as consulting with the district council on the maintenance, repair, and improvement of highways, drainage, footpaths, public transport, and street cleaning. Conservation matters (including trees and listed buildings) and environmental issues are also the responsibility of the council.

The village falls within the non-metropolitan district of Somerset West and Taunton, which was established on 1 April 2019. It was previously in the district of West Somerset, which was formed on 1 April 1974 under the Local Government Act 1972, and part of Williton Rural District before that. The district council is responsible for local planning and building control, local roads, council housing, environmental health, markets and fairs, refuse collection and recycling, cemeteries and crematoria, leisure services, parks, and tourism.

Somerset County Council is responsible for running the largest and most expensive local services such as education, social services, libraries, main roads, public transport, policing and  fire services, trading standards, waste disposal and strategic planning.

It is also part of the Bridgwater and West Somerset county constituency represented in the House of Commons of the Parliament of the United Kingdom. It elects one Member of Parliament (MP) by the first past the post system of election.

Geography

The village actually consists of three settlements. One of these is up Pardlestone Lane, which meanders steeply southwards through mossy cottages, and a few more modern bungalows nestle into the hillside. Berta Lawrence, in her book Quantock Country, suggests that the name Pardlestone derives from the old alternative 'Parleston', where a tiny settlement here belonged to a Saxon called Parlo. "But," she writes, "there are local inhabitants who tell of a mythical Frenchman called Pardel and an equally mythical Pardel's Stone stuck somewhere up this lane."

A further settlement lies along the ridge to the east of the village, with a steep and narrow lane running down to join Sea Lane at Meadow House, which was once the Rectory. From halfway down this lane there is a panoramic view of the coastline as far as North Hill in Minehead and across the channel to South Wales and the Brecon Beacons. In the foreground lie the Church of St Mary, the ruins of a medieval chantry and one old barn still standing, though dilapidated, with traditional round stone pillars. Alongside the chantry are two houses and a tea-garden. Lane End was built in traditional cob construction by the distinguished Arts and Crafts architect Norman Jewson as a summer house for himself.

A path leads down from the chantry through fields now used as a car-park to the beach which William Wordsworth, the Romantic poet, who lived for a brief period with his sister Dorothy at Alfoxton House, described as "Kilve's delightful shore". The beach is on the West Somerset Coast Path.

Kilve Pill, where the stream from Holford runs into the sea, was once a tiny port, used for importing culm, an inferior type of coal which was used in the lime burning process. It was also the site for "glatting" which was the hunting of conger eels by dogs. On the shore a Saint Keyne serpent can be seen, which a local legend says is a snake turned to stone, but is in reality an ammonite.

It is just possible to make out the remains of a stone jetty and the ruins of a lime kiln nearby. Here the limestone was burnt to provide farmers with the lime to spread on their fields. The limestone carrier Laurina was wrecked at Kilve in 1876. The Pill was long associated with smuggling and legend has it that barrels of spirits hidden in the chantry were deliberately set fire to as the revenue men appeared on the scene. Legend also has it that the smugglers' ponies were taught to respond to the commands "whoa" and "gee up" in the reverse sense of the words.

Along the whole length of the stream from Holford to the shore at Kilve there were a number of working mills. Farmers appear to have used water-power in the same way as modern ones use the power from engines. The old mill in the village, now a private house, still retains its overshot wheel, but the others have long since vanished.

Landmarks
Oil Retort House, a Grade II listed building, is located in Kilve.

Kilve Court

South of the village is Kilve Court Residential and Outdoor Learning Centre, which runs a wide range of courses for young people including Adventurous Activity Courses set in the centre's extensive grounds and Academic Enrichment Courses, designed to help gifted and talented children to develop their skills in subjects such as Art, Drama, English and Maths. Kilve Court is one of the few centres in the country to run instructive Creative Writing for ages up to and including 16, with  published authors, such as Beth Webb, directing courses. The main part of the building was constructed between 1702 and 1705, in the reign of Queen Anne, by Henry Sweating, and incorporating an earlier dwelling, although alterations were made in the 1920s by Clough Williams-Ellis. Somerset County Council acquired the house in 1964 and it was opened in 1965 with residential places for 26 children and four members of staff. Since that date there have been a number of extensions and the house, together with a hutted camp site on the hill above, can now accommodate a total of 166. Kilve Court is a major employer in the village.

Religious sites

The Church of St Mary dates back to the 14th century. In the vestry is one remaining carved arch of the ancient screen. The tower has recently had a considerable amount of restorative work done on it, and is now rendered and painted a shade of off-white, as the whole church was until the early years of the 20th century. Since 1969 it has been designated a Grade II* listed building.

Kilve Chantry was founded in 1329, when a brotherhood of five monks was employed to say Mass for their founder, Simon de Furneaux. The Roll of Incumbents shows that several successive chantry priests were incumbents of Kilve parish. The chantry seems to have fallen into a ruin long before the dissolution of the monasteries, and for centuries it served as a barn for the adjacent farm. The building stayed in use for many years, possibly by smugglers, until a fire in 1848. It is now listed on English Heritage's Heritage at Risk register as "very bad" with a priority rating of "A", the highest possible.

Blue Ben

Kilve is said to have once been home to a dragon called Blue Ben. The skull of a fossilised Ichthyosaur on display in the local museum is sometimes pointed out as belonging to Blue Ben.

Cultural references
The video to Bryan Adams' hit song "(Everything I Do) I Do It for You" was filmed on Kilve beach showing the geological cliff formations.

References

External links

 Kilve Village Official Website
 Kilve Court official website

Villages in West Somerset
Ports and harbours of Somerset
Civil parishes in Somerset
Beaches of Somerset